Aleksandr Serov may refer to:

Alexander Serov (1820–1871), Russian composer
Alexander Serov (cyclist) (born 1982), Russian cyclist
Aleksander Serov (born 1954), Ukrainian-born Russian popular singer